Athauda Seneviratne (19 September 1931 – 31 March 2022) was a Sri Lankan politician and a member of the Parliament of Sri Lanka. He was also a Cabinet Minister of Sri Lanka.

Political career
In 1957 Athauda was elected to the Village Council of Othara Gam Dolaha Pattu. In 1960 he unsuccessfully contested the March 1960 parliamentary election in the Dedigama Electoral District. At the 1965 parliamentary election he ran in the Ruwanwella Electoral District, representing the Lanka Sama Samaja Party (LSSP), failing by 417 votes although he did win the seat at the subsequent elections in 1970, defeating the sitting member P. C. Imbulana by 2,936 votes. He however failed to get re-elected in 1977 losing by 4,067 votes to P. C. Imbulana.

Athauda was elected as a member of the Sabaragamuwa Provincial Council and became the Leader of the Opposition at the Provincial Council in 1988. In June 1999 he was appointed the Chief Minister of Sabaragamuwa Province a position he retained until October 2000.

In 1989 he was elected to parliament representing the Kegalle Electoral District a position that he retained until the 2015 elections.

See also
 Cabinet of Sri Lanka

References

External links
Sri Lanka Parliament profile

1931 births
2022 deaths
People from Colombo
Members of the Sabaragamuwa Provincial Council
Chief Ministers of Sabaragamuwa Province
Members of the 7th Parliament of Ceylon
Members of the 9th Parliament of Sri Lanka
Members of the 10th Parliament of Sri Lanka
Members of the 11th Parliament of Sri Lanka
Members of the 12th Parliament of Sri Lanka
Members of the 13th Parliament of Sri Lanka
Provincial councillors of Sri Lanka
Members of the 14th Parliament of Sri Lanka
Labour ministers of Sri Lanka